Dumenza is a comune (municipality) in the Province of Varese in the Italian region of Lombardy, located about  northwest of Milan and about  north of Varese, on the border with Switzerland.

The municipality of Dumenza contains the frazioni (subdivisions, mainly villages and hamlets) Runo (birthplace of painter Bernardino Luini), Due Cossani, Stivigliano, and Trezzino.

Dumenza borders the following municipalities: Agra, Astano (Switzerland), Curiglia con Monteviasco, Luino, Maccagno con Pino e Veddasca, Miglieglia (Switzerland), Monteggio (Switzerland), Novaggio (Switzerland), Sessa (Switzerland).

Notable people

Vincenzo Peruggia

Bartolomeo Scappi

References

External links
Official website 

Cities and towns in Lombardy